Baby Burlesks was a series of Pre-Code short films produced by Educational Pictures in the early 1930s. The series featured three-year-old Shirley Temple in her first screen appearances. In her autobiography, Temple describes the Baby Burlesks series as "a cynical exploitation of our childish innocence," and that the short films were sometimes racist or sexist.

Filmography

All eight films in the Baby Burlesks series were produced by Jack Hays and directed by Charles Lamont, except the first, Runt Page, which was directed by Ray Nazarro. As a star, Temple, received $10 a day. In 2009, all eight films were available on videocassette and DVD.

Runt Page
War Babies 
Pie Covered Wagon 
Glad Rags to Riches 
Kid in Hollywood 
The Kid's Last Fight 
Polly Tix in Washington
Kid 'in' Africa

See also
 Shirley Temple filmography

References

Works cited

External links 

The Kid's Last Fight at the Internet Movie Database

War Babies at the Internet Archive
Partial script from Polly-Tix in Washington at the IMDB

1932 films
1933 films
American film series
American black-and-white films
Educational Pictures short films
Films directed by Charles Lamont
Films directed by Ray Nazarro
1931 comedy films
1931 films
Universal Pictures short films
Comedy film series
Cultural depictions of Jack Dempsey
1933 comedy films
1932 comedy films